Sz is a digraph of the Latin script, used in Polish, Kashubian, Hungarian and German, and in the Wade–Giles system of Romanization of Chinese, as well as the Hong Kong official romanization of Cantonese.

Polish
In Polish orthography, sz represents a voiceless retroflex fricative . It usually corresponds to š or ш in other Slavic languages. It is usually approximated by English speakers with the "sh" sound (and conversely, Polish speakers typically approximate the English digraph sh with the "sz" sound), although the two sounds are not completely identical.

Like other Polish digraphs, it is not considered a single letter for collation purposes.

sz should not be confused with ś (or s followed by i), termed "soft sh", a voiceless alveolo-palatal fricative .

Examples of sz
 (area, territory)
 (coat, cloak)
 (Thomas)

Compare ś:
 (candle)
 (to go)
 (August)

Kashubian
In Kashubian, sz represents a voiceless postalveolar fricative , identical to the English "sh" or a voiceless retroflex fricative  as in Polish.

Examples
These examples are Kashubian words that use the letter sz, with the English translation following.

szãtopiérz = bat
szczawa = sorrel
szczãka = jaw
szczëka = pike (fish type)
szerszéń = hornet

Hungarian
Sz is the thirty-second letter of the Hungarian alphabet. It represents  and is called "esz" . Thus, names like Liszt are pronounced  list.

In Hungarian, even if two characters are put together to make a different sound, they are considered one letter (a true digraph), and even acronyms keep the letter intact.

Hungarian usage of s and sz is almost the reverse of the Polish usage. In Hungarian, s represents  (a sound similar to ). Therefore, the Hungarian capital of Budapest is natively pronounced, rhyming with standard English fleshed rather than pest.

There is also a zs in Hungarian, which is the last (forty-fourth) letter of the alphabet, following z.

Examples
These examples are Hungarian words that use the letter sz, with the English translation following:
szabó = tailor
szép = beautiful
szikla = rock
szőke = blonde
szülő = parent
szusi = sushi
Olaszország = Italy

German
In German, it was used to represent  after "long" vowels, later contracting to the ß ligature.

Wade–Giles
In the Wade–Giles system of Romanization of Chinese,  is used to represent the syllabic  with the "empty rime". See Wade–Giles → Empty rime.

See also
 Hungarian alphabet
 Polish alphabet
 ß, called S-Sharp

Latin-script digraphs